Dominique McElligott (born March 5, 1986) is an Irish actress. She has appeared as a series regular on Raw (2008), Hell on Wheels (2011–2012), The Astronaut Wives Club (2015), House of Cards (2016–2017), The Last Tycoon (2016), and The Boys (2019–2022).

Early life and education
McElligott grew up in Dublin. She began acting during secondary school. She is a graduate of University College Dublin.

Career 
She starred in Moon (2009) and the RTÉ television series Raw before leaving to film Leap Year (2010). In 2011, she starred at the movie The Guard. From 2011 to 2012, she played a lead role in the AMC series Hell on Wheels. In 2015, she starred in ABC's The Astronaut Wives Club. In 2016, McElligott played Hannah Conway, wife of the Republican presidential nominee, in the fourth and fifth season of the Netflix show House of Cards. She plays Queen Maeve on Amazon Prime Video's original series The Boys, which is based on the comic book series of the same name.

Filmography

Film

Television

References

External links

 

1986 births
Living people
21st-century Irish actresses
Irish film actresses
Irish television actresses
Actresses from Dublin (city)
Alumni of University College Dublin